Sarah Thomas (born 15 September 1934) is a Malayalam language writer from Kerala, India. Her novel Narmadi Pudava won the Kerala Sahitya Akademi Award in the year 1979. Thomas is also a recipient of Kerala Sahitya Akademi Award for Overall Contribution to Malayalam Literature.

Career 
Thomas had started writing long before the concept of feminine literature evolved in Malayalam. She published her first novel Jivitamenna Nadi at the age of 34. She became noted in the literary field after the publication of the novel Murippadukal in 1971. The novel narrated the life of a young man brought up in a Roman Catholic orphanage and later transferred to his Hindu ancestral home, where he is subtly persuaded to conform to Hindu religious beliefs. His attempts to establish an identity for himself in a situation full of conflicts were dealt with in the novel. It was later filmed as Manimuzhakkam by P. A. Backer, that won several awards, including the National Film Award for Best Feature Film in Malayalam and the Kerala State Film Award for Best Film. 

There are three other novels of hers, Asthamayam, Pavizhamuthu and Archana, which too have been filmed. Her best known work is Narmani Putava which won the Kerala Sahitya Akademi Award in 1979. The novel portrayed a Brahmin girl whose fate it was to agree to marry the man of her father's choice so that he would have a peaceful end. Two books the author rates as her favourite are Daivamakkal and Grahanam. A milestone in Kerala's Dalit literature, Daivamakkal (Children of God) tells the tale of a Dalit boy, his trials and tribulations as a medical student as well as in later life. Kunjikannan, the protagonist of the novel, is a symbol of an individual trying to break from the often sub-human status that was his lot. The novel was translated into English by Sosanna Kuruvilla. Grahanam (Eclipse) narrates the harrowing experiences that a Keralite boy and his lady love, a German, had to undergo in Lebanon.

Works
 Jivitamenna Nadi (1968)
 Murippadukal (1971)
 Pavizha Muthu (1972)
 Archana (1977)
 Narmadi Pudava (1978)
 Daivamakkal (1982)
 Agni Suddhi (1988)
 Chinnammu (1988)
 Valakkar (1994)
 Neelakkurinjikal Chuvakkum Neram (1995)
 Asthamayam
 Gunitham Thettiya Kanakku
 Grahanam
 Thanneer Panthal
 Yathra
 Kaveri

References 

1934 births
Indian women novelists
Malayalam-language writers
Malayalam novelists
Recipients of the Kerala Sahitya Akademi Award
Living people
Writers from Thiruvananthapuram
20th-century Indian novelists
Women writers from Kerala
20th-century Indian women writers
Novelists from Kerala